Silvio Demanuele (born 17 July 1961) is a Maltese former footballer who played as a forward. He played for Floriana and the Malta national team.

Club career

Demanuele played for Floriana until 1983.

International career

Demanuele made seven appearances for Malta and scored his only international goal in a 12–1 defeat against Spain.

References

External links

1961 births
Living people
Maltese footballers
Malta international footballers
Association football forwards
Floriana F.C. players
Place of birth missing (living people)